Lepidosperma sieberi is a grass-like plant found in southern Australia. Usually seen in heath, forest and woodland, often on moist sandy sites, it may grow to 60 centimetres tall. The specific epithet sieberi honours the botanist and collector Franz Sieber.

References

sieberi
Flora of New South Wales
Flora of Victoria (Australia)
Flora of Tasmania
Flora of South Australia
Flora of Queensland
Poales of Australia
Plants described in 1837